SXM is a software transactional memory system under development at Microsoft Research.

Overview
The SXM API is exposed via managed code and is used to synchronize access to shared memory without using locks. It achieves mutual exclusion using database-like atomicity transactions. SXM uses the Reflection and dynamic code generation capabilities of .NET Framework to emit CIL code to enable atomic transactions on shared data structures directly at runtime. SXM has been written in C#.

See also
Concurrency control
Shared memory

External links
C# Software Transactional Memory

Microsoft Research